Yehiel Duvdevani (born 1896, died 30 April 1988) was a Zionist activist and politician.

Biography
Born in Volhynia region of the Russian Empire (now in Ukraine), Duvdevani attended high school in Kiev, before spending a year at university. He joined the Al HaMishmar movement, which became Dror. In 1923 he made aliyah to Mandatory Palestine, and two years later was amongst the founders of kibbutz Givat HaShlosha.

He became secretary of the Petah Tikva Workers Council. During World War II he enlisted in the Jewish Brigade. Prior to the 1949 elections he was placed nineteenth on the Mapai list, and was elected as the party won 46 seats. However, he did not run for re-election in 1951.

In 1952 Duvdevani  was amongst the founders of kibbutz Einat, which was made up of former Givat HaShlosha and Ramat HaKovesh members who had left the HaKibbutz HaMeuhad movement. He later held the post of chief executive of Mekorot between 1954 and 1964, also serving as chair of its board of directors from 1962 to 1964.

He died in 1988.

References

External links

1896 births
1988 deaths
People from Volyn Oblast
People from Volhynian Governorate
Jews from the Russian Empire
Ukrainian Jews
Soviet Jews
Soviet emigrants to Mandatory Palestine
Jews in Mandatory Palestine
Mapai politicians
Members of the 1st Knesset (1949–1951)
Mandatory Palestine military personnel of World War II
Jewish Brigade personnel
Ukrainian Zionists
Zionist activists
Kibbutzniks